Artificial intelligence is used by many different businesses and organizations. It is widely used in the financial sector, especially by accounting firms, to help detect fraud.

In 2022, PricewaterhouseCoopers reported that fraud has impacted 46% of all businesses in the world. The shift from working in person to working from home has brought increased access to data. According to a FTC (Federal Trade Commission) study from 2022, customers reported fraud of approximately $5.8 billion in 2021, an increase of 70% from the year before. The majority of these scams were imposter scams and online shopping frauds.

Tools

Expert systems 
Expert systems were first designed in the 1970s as an expansion into artificial intelligence technologies. Their design is based on the premise of decreasing potential user error in decision-making and emulating mental reasoning used by experts in a particular field. They differentiate themselves from traditional linear reasoning models by separating identified points in data and processing them individually at the same time. Though, these systems do not rely purely on machine-learned intelligence.

Information regarding rules, practices, and procedures in the form of "if then" statements are implemented into the programming of the system. Users interact with the system by feeding information into the system either through direct entry or import of external data. An inference system compares the information provided by the user with corresponding rules that are believed to specifically apply to the situation. Using this information and the corresponding rules will be used to create a solution to the user's query. Expert systems will generally not operate properly when the common procedures for a specified situation are ambiguous due to the need for well-defined rules.

Implementation of expert systems in accounting procedures are feasible in areas where professional judgement is required. Situations where expert systems are applicable include investigations into transactions that involve potential fraudulent entries, instances of going concern, and the evaluation of risk in the planning stages of an audit.

Continuous auditing 
Continuous auditing is a set of processes that assess various aspects of information gathered in an audit to classify areas of risk and potential weaknesses in financial Internal controls at a more frequent rate than traditional methods. Instead of analyzing recorded transactions and journal entries on a periodic basis, continuous auditing focuses on interpreting the character of these actions more frequently. The frequency of these processes being undertaken as well as highlighting areas of importance is up to the discretion of their implementer, who commonly makes such decisions based on level of risk in the accounts being evaluated and the goals of implementing the system. Performance of these processes can occur as frequently as being nearly instantaneous with an entry being posted.

The processes involved with analyzing financial data in continuous auditing can include the creation of spreadsheets to allow for interactive information gathering, calculation of financial ratios for comparison with previously created models, and detection of errors in entered figures. A primary goal of this practice is to allow for quicker and easier detection of instances of faulty controls, errors, and instances of fraud.

Machine learning and deep learning 

The ability of machine learning and deep learning to swiftly and effectively sort through vast volumes of data in the forms of various documents relevant to companies and documents being audited makes them applicable to the domains of audit and fraud detection. Examples of this include recognizing key language in contracts, identifying levels of risk of fraud in transactions, and assessing journal entries for misstatement.

Applications

'Big 4' Accounting Firms 
Deloitte created an Al-enabled document-reviewing system in 2014. The system automates the method of reviewing and extraction of relevant information from different business documents. Deloitte claims that this innovation has made a difference by reducing time spent going through lawful contract documents, invoices, money related articulations, and board minutes by up to 50%. Working with IBM's Watson, Deloitte is developing cognitive-technology-enhanced commerce arrangements for its clients. LeasePoint is fueled by IBM Tririga and uses Deloitte's industrial information to create an end-to-end leasing portfolio. Automated Cognitive Resource Assessment employs IBM's Maximo innovation to progress the proficiency of asset inspection.

Ernst and Young (EY) connected Al to the investigation of lease contracts. EY (Australia) has also received Al-enabled auditing technology. The firm has propelled the use of AI computer vision to empower clients to monitor stock amid the auditing process. EY is using profound learning to analyze unstructured information such as e-mails, social media posts, and conference call sound records.

Collaborating with H20.ai, PwC developed an Al-enabled framework (GL.ai) capable of analyzing reports and preparing reports. PwC claims to have made a significant investment in normal dialect processing (NLP), an Al-enabled innovation to process unstructured information efficiently.

KPMG built a portfolio of Al instruments, called KPMG Ignite, to upgrade trade decisions and forms. Working with Microsoft and IBM Watson, KPMG is creating instruments to coordinated Al, data analytics, Cognitive Technologies, and RPA.

Advantages

Efficiency 
The process of auditing an entity in an attempt to detect fraudulent activity requires the repeating of investigatory processes until an error or misstatement may be identified. Under traditional methods, these processes would be carried out by a human being. Proponents of artificial intelligence in fraud detection have stated that these traditional methods are inefficient and can be more quickly accomplished with the aid of an intelligent computing system. A survey of 400 chief executive officers created by KPMG in 2016 found that approximately 58% believed that artificial intelligence would play a key role in making audit more efficient in the future.

Data interpretation 
Higher levels of fraud detection entail the use of professional judgement to interpret data. Supporters of artificial intelligence being used in financial audits have claimed that increased risks from instances of higher data interpretation can be minimized through such technologies. One necessary element of an audit of financial statements that requires professional judgement is the implementation of thresholds for materiality. Materiality entails the distinction between errors and transactions in financial statements that would impact decisions made by users of those financial statements. The threshold for materiality in an audit is set by the auditor based on various factors. Artificial intelligence has been used to interpret data and suggest materiality thresholds to be implemented through the use of expert systems.

Decreased costs 
Those in favor of using artificial intelligence to complete investigations of fraud have stated that such technologies decrease the amount of time required to complete tasks that are repetitive in nature. The claim further states that such efficiencies allow for lowered resource requirements, which can then be further spent on tasks that have not been fully automated. The audit firm Ernst & Young has posited these claims by declaring that their deep learning systems have been used to reduce time spent on administrative tasks by analyzing relevant audit documents. According to the firm, this has allowed their employees to focus more on judgement and analysis.

Disadvantages

Inexperience in early stages 
Artificial intelligence is very new. One specific problem with artificial intelligence in auditing is the need for the extensive collection of data; a large dataset is needed.

Initial investment requirement 
Along with a knowledge of coding and building systems through computer programs, we are seeing the advantages of these systems, but since they are so new, they require a large investment to start building your system. Any firm that is planning on implementing an AI system to detect fraud must hire a team of data scientists, along with upgrading their cloud system and data storage as well. The system must be consistently monitored and updated to be the most efficient form of itself, otherwise the likelihood of fraud being involved in those transactions increases. If you do not initially invest in your system and are certain it will detect a large percentage of fraud, you will reap the consequences of large transactions of fraud, along with chargeback fees. It is a very large initial investment, but when the investment is made by the company and the data scientists invest in the work they do, you should save yourself a lot of money because you will never have to pay a robot to detect fraud. You may need the people to help build the robot, but over time the costs will minimize.

Technical expertise 
Data analytics is a new science at many companies, and firms are heavily researching it to analyze their business as a whole and find where they can improve. Data analytics tells the story of a business through numbers. There are many people in this world that are experienced with reading data, but there are also more people who are not as experienced with data at all. The discipline of data analytics is expanding rapidly. It is frequently challenging to become an expert in such a profession.

References 

Fraud
Deep learning
Logic programming
Fraud
Artificial intelligence
Finance fraud